Thambiluvil Sri Sivalinga Pillayar Temple  is one of the most significant Hindu temples in the Ampara District of Eastern Province, Sri Lanka

Hindu temples in Ampara District
Thambiluvil